Shabli may refer to:
 Shabli, Ardabil
 Shabli, North Khorasan